Compassion fatigue is a condition characterized by a gradual lessening of compassion over time. With the constant overexposure to strong, violent images and texts spread by the media and specially news stories in journalism, people are losing more and more the ability to feel empathy for others in complicated, dramatic and delicate situations.

In order to analyse and understand this phenomenon better, it is important to distinguish between different types of compassion and then discuss different media and types of journalism and their role in compassion fatigue, such as photojournalism, films and documentaries, social media and newspapers.

It is shown that compassion is often a more female reaction while indifference is more common among male audiences. It is further shown that there are different forms of compassion as well as different forms of indifference. The results challenge or strongly modulate the thesis about a pronounced compassion fatigue among people in general.

Newspapers 
The print media has a massive role when it comes to compassion fatigue. In fact, it was one of the first media to influence the audience in terms of spreading shocking content. Being part of the entertainment industry, the newspapers need to captive their audience no matter what, as they pay their way through selling advertising, not selling news. With that said, they must appeal to the largest audience, with attractive demographics for advertisers, and the best way to do that is by covering international shocking affairs, to make the world fascinating.

The problem is that these days people are more bored and less impressionable, specially if the problems reported are not easy no solve, therefore, to update, like famine in Somalia or war in Bosnia. Quickly, they turn to other subjects, like the next fashion trend or the next war, which makes everyone forget about the previous one.

The causes of compassion fatigue, when it comes to the print, are indeed multiple. Sometimes bad things are happening at the same time, or readers are simply too saturated with news that they don't take it seriously anymore; even political cartoonists start making jokes about uncomfortable events.

In addition, formulaic coverage of similar types of crisis give us the illusion that we have seen this story before. Always the same pictures and introduction, the bad guys and the good ones, the same chronological events.

"If one of the partners in a conflict is one that most people can identify with as a good guy, then you’ve got a situation in which is possible to root for the home team. That’s what a lot of news is about. We love to see everything in terms of black and white, right and wrong, truths versus lies,” according to Malcolm Brown, former foreign correspondent for AP, ABC and The New York Times. “Unless a disease appears to be out of a Stephen King horror movie- unless it devours your body like the flesh-eating strep bacteria, consumes your brain like mad cow disease, or turns your insides to bloody slush like Ebola. it’s not hardly worth mentioning in print."

Journalists want their stories to make it to the front-page, but the public's reaction is often to just turn the page, no empathy, no compassion.

Plus, there is never a slow season of disaster, it is something permanent and we are becoming permanently apathetic.

Photojournalism

Audience 
The connection between photography and compassion fatigue comes from the role images have played in the charitable appeals and associated media coverage of suffering others. Susan Sontag is the most noted proponent of the idea that photography of suffering has done much to numb the audience and help produce apathy and/or indifference. In On Photography she famously asserts: ''in these last decades, ''concerned'' photography had done at least as much to deaden conscience as to arouse it.’'

Moeller agrees that compassion fatigue in photojournalism is not an unavoidable consequence of covering the news. It is however, an unavoidable consequence of the way the news is now covered. It is a consequence of a rote journalism and looking over one's shoulder reporting, to many catastrophes at once, and coverage that is too repetitious, much of the media looks alike, the same news, the same picture, which turns compassion fatigue inevitable.

Together with the much-quoted statement that 'images anesthetize', Sontag provided the rhetorical force sustain the idea of photography's responsibility for compassion fatigue. Sontag argues that familiarity with images is what determines the emotion that people summon in response to photographs of suffering, in other words, the more one sees a picture of suffering, the less one will fell because they will become anesthetized.

For example, Don McCullin's photographs of emaciated Biafrans in the early 1970s had less impact for some people than Werner Bischof'’ photographs of Indian famine victims in the early 1950s because those images had become banal, and the photographs of Tuareg families dying of starvation in the Sub-Saharan that appeared in magazines everywhere in 1973 must have seemed to many like unbearable replay of a now familiar atrocity exhibition.''

Photographer 
Regarding the photographers side of Photojournalism, Sontag argues that photographing is essentially an act of non-intervention, therefore this inability to react in real life apparently touches photographer too.

Since the photographers cannot intervene in events, part of the horror of memorable coups of photojournalism, which includes images of death comes from the awareness of how plausible it has become, in situations where the photographer has the choice between a photograph and a life, to choose the photograph.

Even if the photographer creates sympathy, they also cut it off; they stir the senses but their 'realism crates a confession about the real', which, in the long term has the inevitable analgesic effect.

Films and Documentaries 
Compassion, has grown in the joint between politics, humanitarian organizations, the media and the public. In the media there has been a growing focus on distant victims of civil wars, massacres and other violence against civil populations. The audience is left unmoved by the pictures of distant death and pain.

Nick Clooney 
An example of compassion fatigue seen with documentaries is the case of Nick Clooney. After his visit to Darfur in 2006 where he documented the genocide. He wanted to tell people of the atrocities in Darfur, but wanted to encourage his audience to act on it. He chose the format of documentary because he felt it gave him more freedom to be “honest,” about what was happening in Darfur.“ I went as a reporter, came back as an advocate."In his book Human Rights Journalism, Seaga Shaw explains how there needs to be a bigger shift away from the familiar to the unfamiliar to provoke a reaction in audiences. Shaw advocates "It will promote a better understanding of the undercurrents of the events and issues at stake, which will in turn provoke a more adequate response from the audience and live up to the expectations that journalism can influence the future direction of society."

Social media 
Social media and compassion fatigue are related by the bridge that media creates between its users and access to information. With all of the resources made available by the online world, most of its users tend to see tragic articles and stories on different social media on a daily basis. After a few hours, the overwhelming amount of information becomes emotionally draining for the human brain. The brain's natural response is to deny or suppress emotion, or in other words, to shut down compassion. Over time, the ongoing anguish is capable of creating a gap in the brain, and every emotion starts to become heavy and tiring. As a result of this fatigue from news information overload, news consumers become more selective about the news they consume via social media.

According to a research made by Keith Payne and Dayrl Cameron, psychologists at UNC Chapel Hill, the more victims people see (getting hurt or killed) online, the more they shut their emotions, for fear of it becoming too much. Plus, choosing whether to experience or suppress an emotion might alter our empathetic feelings.

Overexposure to social media can also alter compassion in the way that people see reality. It blurs the line between what is acceptable, and take it to extremes. It can change how users see violence, creating a reality where violence is tolerable. It also open doors to racism, sexism, political rants, or any other form of discrimination against a social minority/group of people.

References

Journalism